The Miami Marlins' 2022 season was the 30th season for the Major League Baseball (MLB) franchise in the National League and the 11th as the Miami Marlins. The Marlins played their home games at LoanDepot Park as members of the National League East Division.

On December 2, 2021, Commissioner of Baseball Rob Manfred announced a lockout of players, following expiration of the collective bargaining agreement (CBA) between the league and the Major League Baseball Players Association (MLBPA). On March 10, 2022, the MLB and MLBPA agreed to a new collective bargaining agreement, thus ending the lockout. Opening Day was played on April 7. Although MLB previously announced that several series would be cancelled due to the lockout, the agreement provides for a 162-game season, with originally canceled games to be made up via doubleheaders.

On February 28, 2022, Derek Jeter resigned as team CEO and ceded his ownership stake.

On September 25, 2022, the Marlins and manager Don Mattingly mutually agreed to part ways following the conclusion of the 2022 season.

Offseason

Lockout 

The expiration of the league's collective bargaining agreement (CBA) with the Major League Baseball Players Association occurred on December 1, 2021 with no new agreement in place. As a result, the team owners voted unanimously to lockout the players stopping all free agency and trades. 

The parties came to an agreement on a new CBA on March 10, 2022.

Rule changes 
Pursuant to the new CBA, several new rules were instituted for the 2022 season. The National League will adopt the designated hitter full-time, a draft lottery will be implemented, the postseason will expand from ten teams to twelve, and advertising patches will appear on player uniforms and helmets for the first time.

Roster

Regular season

National League East

National League Wild Card

Game Log

 
|- style="background:#fbb;"
| 1 || April 8 || @ Giants || 5–6  || Álvarez (1–0) || Bass (0–1) || — || Oracle Park || 40,853 || 0–1 || L1
|- style="background:#bfb;" 
| 2 || April 9 || @ Giants || 2–1 || Okert (1–0) || McGee (0–1) || Bender (1) || Oracle Park || 38,885 || 1–1 || W1
|- style="background:#fbb;"
| 3 || April 10 || @ Giants || 2–3 || García (1–0) || Rogers (0–1) || Leone (1) || Oracle Park || 37,332 || 1–2 || L1
|- style="background:#fbb;" 
| 4 || April 11 || @ Angels || 2–6 || Lorenzen (1–0) || Hernández (0–1) || — || Angel Stadium || 20,480 || 1–3 || L2
|- style="background:#fbb;" 
| 5 || April 12 || @ Angels || 3–4 || Iglesias (1–0) || Bender (0–1) || — || Angel Stadium || 16,132 || 1–4 || L3
|- style="background:#bfb;" 
| 6 || April 14 || Phillies || 4–3 || Alcántara (1–0) || Gibson (1–1) || Bender (2) || LoanDepot Park || 31,184 || 2–4 || W1
|- style="background:#bfb;" 
| 7 || April 15 || Phillies || 7–1 || López (1–0) || Eflin (0–1) || — || LoanDepot Park || 11,990 || 3–4 || W2
|- style="background:#fbb;"
| 8 || April 16 || Phillies || 3–10 || Suárez (1–0) || Rogers (0–2) || — || LoanDepot Park || 13,412 || 3–5 || L1
|- style="background:#bfb;" 
| 9 || April 17 || Phillies || 11–3 || Hernández (1–1) || Wheeler (0–2) || — || LoanDepot Park || 11,476 || 4–5 || W1
|- style="background:#fbb;" 
| 10 || April 19 || Cardinals || 1–5 || Wainwright (2–1) || Luzardo (0–1) || — || LoanDepot Park || 8,475 || 4–6 || L1
|- style="background:#fbb;" 
| 11 || April 20 || Cardinals || 0–2 || Cabrera (1–0) || Bender (0–2) || Gallegos (3) || LoanDepot Park || 8,655 || 4–7 || L2
|- style="background:#bfb;" 
| 12 || April 21 || Cardinals || 5–0 || López (2–0) || Hicks (1–1) || — || LoanDepot Park || 9,670 || 5–7 || W1
|- style="background:#fbb;" 
| 13 || April 22 || @ Braves || 0–3 || Wright (2–0) || Rogers (0–3) || Jansen (4) || Truist Park || 40,402 || 5–8 || L1
|- style="background:#bfb;" 
| 14 || April 23 || @ Braves || 9–7 || Okert (2–0) || Strider (0–1) || Scott (1) || Truist Park || 41,931 || 6–8 || W1
|- style="background:#bfb;" 
| 15 || April 24 || @ Braves || 5–4 || Luzardo (1–1) || Elder (1–2) || Head (1) || Truist Park || 38,440 || 7–8 || W2
|- style="background:#bfb;" 
| 16 || April 26 || @ Nationals || 5–2 || Alcántara (2–0) || Gray (2–2) || Bender (3) || Nationals Park || 12,613 || 8–8 || W3
|- style="background:#bfb;" 
| 17 || April 27 || @ Nationals || 2–1 || López (3–0) || Fedde (1–2) || Bender (4) || Nationals Park || 13,356 || 9–8 || W4
|- style="background:#bfb;" 
| 18 || April 28 || @ Nationals || 3–2 || Rogers (1–3) || Corbin (0–4) || Sulser (1) || Nationals Park || 12,454 || 10–8 || W5
|- style="background:#bfb;" 
| 19 || April 29 || Mariners || 8–6 || Hernández (2–1) || Brash (1–2) || Bender (5) || LoanDepot Park || 9,963 || 11–8 || W6
|- style="background:#bfb;" 
| 20 || April 30 || Mariners || 3–1 || Luzardo (2–1) || Ray (2–2) || Bender (6) || LoanDepot Park || 29,010 || 12–8 || W7
|- 

 
|- style="background:#fbb;"
| 21 || May 1 || Mariners || 3–7 || Gilbert (4–0) || Alcántara (2–1) || — || LoanDepot Park || 16,741 || 12–9 || L1
|- style="background:#fbb;" 
| 22 || May 2 || Diamondbacks || 4–5 || Gallen (1–0) || López (3–1) || Kennedy (2) || LoanDepot Park || 6,224 || 12–10 || L2
|- style="background:#fbb;" 
| 23 || May 3 || Diamondbacks || 4–5 || Castellanos (2–1) || Rogers (1–4) || Mantiply (2) || LoanDepot Park || 6,263 || 12–11 || L3
|- style="background:#fbb;" 
| 24 || May 4 || Diamondbacks || 7–8 || Middleton (1–1) || Bender (0–3) || Kennedy (3) || LoanDepot Park || 7,356 || 12–12 || L4
|- style="background:#fbb;"
| 25 || May 5 || @ Padres || 1–2 || Martinez (2–2) || Luzardo (2–2) || Rogers (11) || Petco Park || 31,034 || 12–13 || L5
|- style="background:#fbb;" 
| 26 || May 6 || @ Padres || 2–3 || Darvish (3–1) || Alcántara (2–2) || Wilson (1) || Petco Park || 37,585 || 12–14 || L6
|- style="background:#bfb;" 
| 27 || May 7 || @ Padres || 8–0 || López (4–1) || Manaea (2–3) || — || Petco Park || 34,709 || 13–14 || W1
|- style="background:#fbb;" 
| 28 || May 8 || @ Padres || 2–3 || Suárez (2–1) || Sulser (0–1) || — || Petco Park || 37,937 || 13–15 || L1
|- style="background:#fbb;" 
| 29 || May 9 || @ Diamondbacks || 3–4 || Nelson (1–0) || Hernández (2–2) || Melancon (6) || Chase Field || 11,571 || 13–16 || L2
|- style="background:#fbb;" 
| 30 || May 10 || @ Diamondbacks || 3–9 || Bumgarner (2–1) || Luzardo (2–3) || — || Chase Field || 8,855 || 13–17 || L3
|- style="background:#bfb;" 
| 31 || May 11 || @ Diamondbacks || 11–3 || Bass (1–1) || Melancon (0–4) || — || Chase Field || 9,058 || 14–17 || W1
|- style="background:#fbb;" 
| 32 || May 13 || Brewers || 1–2 || Williams (2–0) || Scott (0–1) || Hader (13) || LoanDepot Park || 9,110 || 14–18 || L1
|- style="background:#bfb;"
| 33 || May 14 || Brewers || 9–3 || Rogers (2–4) || Lauer (3–1) || — || LoanDepot Park || 12,941 || 15–18 || W1
|- style="background:#fbb;" 
| 34 || May 15 || Brewers || 3–7 || Woodruff (4–2) || Hernández (2–3) || Ashby (1) || LoanDepot Park || 11,729 || 15–19 || L1
|- style="background:#bfb;" 
| 35 || May 16 || Nationals || 8–2 || Alcántara (3–2) || Sanchez (2–3) || — || LoanDepot Park || 6,601 || 16–19 || W1
|- style="background:#bfb;" 
| 36 || May 17 || Nationals || 5–1 || Bender (1–3) || Adon (1–7) || — || LoanDepot Park || 8,097 || 17–19 || W2
|- style="background:#fbb;" 
| 37 || May 18 || Nationals || 4–5  || Rainey (1–1) || Castano (0–1) || Arano (1) || LoanDepot Park || 7,566 || 17–20 || L1
|- style="background:#fbb;" 
| 38 || May 20 || Braves || 3–5 || Morton (3–3) || Rogers (2–5) || Smith (2) || LoanDepot Park || 9,776 || 17–21 || L2
|- style="background:#fbb;"  
| 39 || May 21 || Braves || 3–4 || Wright (4–2) || Hernández (2–4) || Jansen (10) || LoanDepot Park || 13,264 || 17–22 || L3
|- style="background:#bfb;" 
| 40 || May 22 || Braves || 4–3 || Alcántara (4–2) || Anderson (3–3) || — || LoanDepot Park || 17,908 || 18–22 || W1
|- style="background:#fbb;" 
| 41 || May 24 || @ Rays || 0–4 || McClanahan (4–2) || López (4–2) || — || Tropicana Field || 9,006 || 18–23 || L1
|- style="background:#fbb;" 
| 42 || May 25 || @ Rays || 4–5 || Rasmussen (5–1) || Poteet (0–1) || Poche (1) || Tropicana Field || 7,520 || 18–24 || L2
|- style="background:#fbb;" 
| 43 || May 27 || @ Braves || 4–6 || Stephens (1–1) || Bass (1–2) || Jansen (11) || Truist Park || 40,064 || 18–25 || L3
|- style="background:#bfb;" 
| 44 || May 28 || @ Braves || 4–1 || Alcántara (5–2) || Davidson (1–2) || Sulser (2) || Truist Park || 40,682 || 19–25 || W1
|- style="background:#fbb;" 
| 45 || May 29 || @ Braves || 3–6 || Fried (5–2) || Hernández (2–5) || Jansen (12) || Truist Park || 39,669 || 19–26 || L1
|- style="background:#fbb;" 
| 46 || May 30 || @ Rockies || 1–7 || Feltner (1–1) || Sulser (0–2) || — || Coors Field || 40,275 || 19–27 || L2
|- style="background:#bbb;" 
| — || May 31 || @ Rockies || colspan=8| Postponed (rain); Makeup June 1
|- 

 
|- style="background:#bfb;" 
| 47 || June 1  || @ Rockies || 14–1 || Cabrera (1–0) || Senzatela (2–3) || — || Coors Field ||  || 20–27 || W1
|- style="background:#fbb;" 
| 48 || June 1  || @ Rockies || 12–13  || Bard (3–2) || Sulser (0–3) || — || Coors Field || 22,719 || 20–28 || L1
|- style="background:#bfb;" 
| 49 || June 2 || Giants || 3–0 || Alcántara (6–2) || Wood (3–5) || Scott (2) || LoanDepot Park || 8,202 || 21–28 || W1
|- style="background:#fbb;" 
| 50 || June 3 || Giants || 6–15 || Littell (1–1) || Bleier (0–1) || — || LoanDepot Park || 6,512 || 21–29 || L1
|- style="background:#bfb;" 
| 51 || June 4 || Giants || 5–4 || Scott (1–1) || Rogers (0–2) || — || LoanDepot Park || 7,515 || 22–29 || W1
|- style="background:#fbb;"
| 52 || June 5 || Giants || 1–5 || Junis (3–1) || Garrett (0–1) || — || LoanDepot Park || 9,641 || 22–30 || L1
|- style="background:#bfb;" 
| 53 || June 7 || Nationals || 12–2 || Cabrera (2–0) || Adon (1–10) || — || LoanDepot Park || 7,112 || 23–30 || W1
|- style="background:#bfb;" 
| 54 || June 8 || Nationals || 2–1  || Scott (2–1) || Rainey (1–2) || — || LoanDepot Park || 7,193 || 24–30 || W2
|- style="background:#bfb;" 
| 55 || June 9 || Nationals || 7–4 || Rogers (3–5) || Strasburg (0–1) || Scott (3) || LoanDepot Park || 9,108 || 25–30 || W3
|- style="background:#bfb;"
| 56 || June 10 || @ Astros || 7–4 || Sulser (1–3) || García (3–5) || Scott (4) || Minute Maid Park || 34,163 || 26–30 || W4
|- style="background:#bfb;"
| 57 || June 11 || @ Astros || 5–1 || Garrett (1–1) || Valdez (6–3) || — || Minute Maid Park || 31,379 || 27–30 || W5
|- style="background:#fbb;"
| 58 || June 12 || @ Astros || 4–9 || Verlander (8–2) || Cabrera (2–1) || — || Minute Maid Park || 29,341 || 27–31 || L1
|- style="background:#fbb;"
| 59 || June 13 || @ Phillies || 2–3 || Domínguez (4–1) || Bass (1–3) || — || Citizens Bank Park || 22,701 || 27–32 || L2
|- style="background:#bfb;"
| 60 || June 14 || @ Phillies || 11–9 || Okert (3–0) || Knebel (2–5) || Scott (5) || Citizens Bank Park || 28,073 || 28–32 || W1
|- style="background:#fbb;" 
| 61 || June 15 || @ Phillies || 1–3 || Brogdon (2–0) || Scott (2–2) || — || Citizens Bank Park || 24,726 || 28–33 || L1
|- style="background:#fbb;" 
| 62 || June 17 || @ Mets || 4–10 || Carrasco (8–2) || López (4–3) || — || Citi Field || 36,111 || 28–34 || L2
|- style="background:#fbb;" 
| 63 || June 18 || @ Mets || 2–3 || Walker (5–2) || Garrett (1–2) || Díaz (14) || Citi Field || 40,021 || 28–35 || L3
|- style="background:#bfb;" 
| 64 || June 19 || @ Mets || 6–2 || Alcántara (7–2) || Bassitt (5–5) || — || Citi Field || 41,255 || 29–35 || W1
|- style="background:#fbb;" 
| 65 || June 20 || @ Mets || 0–6 || Peterson (4–1) || Rogers (3–6) || — || Citi Field || 34,937 || 29–36 || L1
|- style="background:#bfb;" 
| 66 || June 21 || Rockies || 9–8 || Okert (4–0) || Colomé (2–1) || Scott (6) || LoanDepot Park || 9,012 || 30–36 || W1
|- style="background:#bfb;" 
| 67 || June 22 || Rockies || 7–4 || López (5–3) || Kuhl (4–5) || — || LoanDepot Park || 8,983 || 31–36 || W2
|- style="background:#bfb;" 
| 68 || June 23 || Rockies || 3–2 || Okert (5–0) || Colomé (2–2) || Scott (7) || LoanDepot Park || 11,854 || 32–36 || W3
|- style="background:#fbb;" 
| 69 || June 24 || Mets || 3–5 || Walker (6–2) || Alcántara (7–3) || Díaz (15) || LoanDepot Park || 11,444 || 32–37 ||L1
|- style="background:#fbb;"
| 70 || June 25 || Mets || 3–5 || Bassitt (6–5) || Yacabonis (0–1) || Díaz (16) || LoanDepot Park || 18,722 || 32–38 || L2
|- style="background:#bfb;" 
| 71 || June 26 || Mets || 3–2 || Scott (3–2) || Ottavino (2–2) || — || LoanDepot Park || 19,343 || 33–38 || W1
|- style="background:#fbb;" 
| 72 || June 27 || @ Cardinals || 0–9 || Wainwright (6–5) || López (5–4) || — || Busch Stadium || 34,701 || 33–39 || L1
|- style="background:#fbb;" 
| 73 || June 28 || @ Cardinals || 3–5 || Hudson (6–4) || Garrett (1–3) || Helsley (6) || Busch Stadium || 32,065 || 33–40 || L2
|- style="background:#bfb;" 
| 74 || June 29 || @ Cardinals || 4–3 || Alcántara (8–3) || Helsley (3–1) || — || Busch Stadium || 35,674 || 34–40 || W1
|-  

 
|- style="background:#bfb;" 
| 75 || July 1 || @ Nationals || 6–3 || Rogers (4–6) || Gray (6–5) || Scott (8) || Nationals Park || 23,794 || 35–40 || W2
|- style="background:#bfb;" 
| 76 || July 2 || @ Nationals || 5–3 || Castano (1–1) || Tetreault (2–2) || Scott (9) || Nationals Park || 19,674 || 36–40 || W3
|- style="background:#bfb;" 
| 77 || July 3 || @ Nationals || 7–4  || Scott (4–2) || Edwards Jr. (2–3) || Floro (1) || Nationals Park || 25,385 || 37–40 || W4
|- style="background:#bfb;" 
| 78 || July 4 || @ Nationals || 3–2  || Yacabonis (1–1) || Rainey (1–3) || Floro (2) || Nationals Park || 25,129 || 38–40 || W5
|- style="background:#bfb;" 
| 79 || July 5 || Angels || 2–1 || Alcántara (9–3) || Syndergaard (5–7) || Scott (10) || LoanDepot Park || 13,338 || 39–40 || W6
|- style="background:#fbb;" 
| 80 || July 6 || Angels || 2–5 || Ohtani (8–4) || Rogers (4–7) || — || LoanDepot Park || 18,741 || 39–41 || L1
|- style="background:#fbb;"
| 81 || July 7 || @ Mets || 0–10 || Williams (2–5) || Castano (1–2) || — || Citi Field || 30,555 || 39–42 || L2
|- style="background:#bfb;"
| 82 || July 8 || @ Mets || 5–2 || López (6–4) || Bassitt (6–6) || Scott (11) || Citi Field || 25,208 || 40–42 || W1
|- style="background:#fbb;" 
| 83 || July 9 || @ Mets || 4–5  || Holderman (4–0) || Scott (4–3) || — || Citi Field || 43,336 || 40–43 || L1
|- style="background:#bfb;"
| 84 || July 10 || @ Mets || 2–0  || Bleier (1–1) || Hunter (0–1) || Scott (12) || Citi Field || 34,774 || 41–43 || W1
|- style="background:#fbb;" 
| 85 || July 11 || Pirates || 1–5 || Keller (3–6) || Rogers (4–8) || De Los Santos (3) || LoanDepot Park || 8,560 || 41–44 || L1
|- style="background:#fbb;"  
| 86 || July 12 || Pirates || 2–3 || Peters (5–2) || Castano (1–3) || Bednar (16) || LoanDepot Park || 8,022 || 41–45 || L2
|- style="background:#bfb;"
| 87 || July 13 || Pirates || 5–4  || Pop (1–0) || Bednar (3–3) || — || LoanDepot Park || 9,524 || 42–45 || W1
|- style="background:#bfb;"
| 88 || July 14 || Pirates || 3–2  || Bleier (2–1) || Crowe (3–6) || — || LoanDepot Park || 13,612 || 43–45 || W2
|- style="background:#fbb;"
| 89 || July 15 || Phillies || 1–2 || Gibson (5–3) || Alcántara (9–4) || Domínguez (4) || LoanDepot Park || 10,193 || 43–46 || L1
|- style="background:#fbb;"
| 90 || July 16 || Phillies || 0–10 || Suárez (7–5) || Meyer (0–1) || — || LoanDepot Park || 13,497 || 43–47 || L2
|- style="background:#fbb;"
| 91 || July 17 || Phillies || 0–4 || Nola (6–7) || Rogers (4–9) || Alvarado (1) || LoanDepot Park || 12,450 || 43–48 || L3
|- style="background:#fbb;"
| 92 || July 21 || Rangers || 0–8 || Gray (7–4) || López (6–5) || — || LoanDepot Park || 9,524 || 43–49 || L4
|- style="background:#bfb;"
| 93 || July 22 || @ Pirates || 8–1 || Garrett (2–3) || Thompson (3–7) || — || PNC Park || 22,316 || 44–49 || W1
|- style="background:#fbb;"
| 94 || July 23 || @ Pirates || 0–1 || Quintana (3–5) || Scott (4–4) || Bednar (17) || PNC Park || 22,560 || 44–50 || L1
|- style="background:#bfb;"
| 95 || July 24 || @ Pirates || 6–5  || Bass (2–3) || Bednar (3–4) || Brigham (1) || PNC Park || 15,188 || 45–50 || W1
|- style="background:#fbb;"
| 96 || July 25 || @ Reds || 2–11 || Lodolo (3–3) || Rogers (4–10) || — || Great American Ball Park || 12,948 || 45–51 || L1
|- style="background:#bfb;"
| 97 || July 26 || @ Reds || 2–1 || López (7–5) || Greene (3–12) || Scott (13) || Great American Ball Park || 14,937 || 46–51 || W1
|- style="background:#fbb;" 
| 98 || July 27 || @ Reds || 3–5 || Castillo (4–4) || Garrett (2–4) || Strickland (6) || Great American Ball Park || 11,387 || 46–52 || L1
|- style="background:#bfb;"
| 99 || July 28 || @ Reds || 7–6 || Pop (2–0) || Strickland (2–3) || Scott (14) || Great American Ball Park || 14,506 || 47–52 || W1
|- style="background:#fbb;" 
| 100 || July 29 || Mets || 4–6 || Ottavino (5–2) || Okert (5–1) || Díaz (23) || LoanDepot Park || 15,131 || 47–53 || L1
|- style="background:#fbb;"
| 101 || July 30 || Mets || 0–4 || Carrasco (11–4) || Neidert (0–1) || — || LoanDepot Park || 16,655 || 47–54 || L2
|- style="background:#fbb;"
| 102 || July 31 || Mets || 3–9 || Walker (9–2) || López (7–6) || — || LoanDepot Park || 17,449 || 47–55 || L3
|- 

 
|- style="background:#fbb;"
| 103 || August 1 || Reds || 1–3 || Greene (4–12) || Luzardo (2–4) || Strickland (7) || LoanDepot Park || 7,701 || 47–56 || L4
|- style="background:#fbb;" 
| 104 || August 2 || Reds || 1–2 || Ashcraft (5–2) || Garrett (2–5) || Díaz (4) || LoanDepot Park || 8,188 || 47–57 || L5
|- style="background:#bfb;"
| 105 || August 3 || Reds || 3–0 || Alcántara (10–4) || Minor (1–8) || — || LoanDepot Park || 8,656 || 48–57 || W1
|- style="background:#fbb;"
| 106 || August 5 || @ Cubs || 1–2 || Wick (3–5) || Floro (0–1) || — || Wrigley Field || 35,689 || 48–58 || L1
|- style="background:#fbb;"
| 107 || August 6 || @ Cubs || 0–4 || Smyly (4–6) || López (7–7) || — || Wrigley Field || 36,787 || 48–59 || L2
|- style="background:#bfb;" 
| 108 || August 7 || @ Cubs || 3–0 || Luzardo (3–4) || Sampson (0–3) || Scott (15) || Wrigley Field || 30,177 || 49–59 || W1
|- style="background:#fbb;" 
| 109 || August 9 || @ Phillies || 1–4 || Wheeler (11–5) || Garrett (2–6) || Domínguez (7) || Citizens Bank Park || 22,087 || 49–60 || L1
|- style="background:#fbb;"
| 110 || August 10 || @ Phillies || 3–4 || Bellatti (3–3) || Alcántara (10–5) || Domínguez (8) || Citizens Bank Park || 23,021 || 49–61 || L2
|- style="background:#bfb;" 
| 111 || August 11 || @ Phillies || 3–0 || Cabrera (3–1) || Gibson (7–5) || Scott (16) || Citizens Bank Park || 25,444 || 50–61 || W1
|- style="background:#fbb;"
| 112 || August 12 || Braves || 3–4 || Matzek (2–2) || Hernández (2–6) || Jansen (25) || LoanDepot Park || 10,459 || 50–62 || L1
|- style="background:#fbb;" 
| 113 || August 13  || Braves || 2–5 || Muller (1–1) || Luzardo (3–5) || Jansen (26) || LoanDepot Park || 7,308 || 50–63 || L2
|- style="background:#fbb;"
| 114 || August 13  || Braves || 2–6 || Anderson (10–6) || Nance (0–1) || Iglesias (17) || LoanDepot Park || 11,910 || 50–64 || L3
|- style="background:#fbb;"
| 115 || August 14 || Braves || 1–3 || Matzek (3–2) || Scott (4–5) || Jansen (27) || LoanDepot Park || 10,902 || 50–65 || L4
|- style="background:#bfb;"
| 116 || August 15 || Padres || 3–0 || Alcántara (11–5) || Musgrove (8–6) || Scott (17) || LoanDepot Park || 9,123 || 51–65 || W1
|- style="background:#bfb;"
| 117 || August 16 || Padres || 4–3 || Hernández (3–6) || García (4–6) || Floro (3) || LoanDepot Park || 9,065 || 52–65 || W2
|- style="background:#fbb;"
| 118 || August 17 || Padres || 3–10 || Morejón (2–0) || López (7–8) || — || LoanDepot Park || 7,273 || 52–66 || L1
|- style="background:#fbb;"
| 119 || August 19 || @ Dodgers || 1–2 || Martin (4–0) || Floro (0–2) || Phillips (2) || Dodger Stadium || 50,431 || 52–67 || L2
|- style="background:#fbb;"
| 120 || August 20 || @ Dodgers || 0–7 || May (1–0) || Hoeing (0–1) || — || Dodger Stadium || 51,813 || 52–68 || L3
|- style="background:#fbb;"
| 121 || August 21 || @ Dodgers || 3–10 || Pepiot (2–0) || Alcántara (11–6) || — || Dodger Stadium || 42,125 || 52–69 || L4
|- style="background:#bfb;"
| 122 || August 22 || @ Athletics || 3–0 || Cabrera (4–1) || Oller (2–6) || Scott (18) || Oakland Coliseum || 2,630 || 53–69 || W1
|- style="background:#bfb;"
| 123 || August 23 || @ Athletics || 5–3 || López (8–8) || Logue (3–8) || Scott (19) || Oakland Coliseum || 4,028 || 54–69 || W2
|- style="background:#fbb;"
| 124 || August 24 || @ Athletics || 2–3  || Puk (3–1) || Bleier (2–2) || — || Oakland Coliseum || 3,901 || 54–70 || L1
|- style="background:#fbb;"
| 125 || August 26 || Dodgers || 6–10  || Price (2–0) || Nardi (0–1) || — || LoanDepot Park || 9,365 || 54–71 || L2
|- style="background:#bfb;"
| 126 || August 27 || Dodgers || 2–1 || Alcántara (12–6) || May (1–1) || — || LoanDepot Park || 23,543 || 55–71 || W1
|- style="background:#fbb;"
| 127 || August 28 || Dodgers || 1–8 || Urías (14–7) || Cabrera (4–2) || — || LoanDepot Park || 13,617 || 55–72 || L1
|- style="background:#fbb;"
| 128 || August 29 || Dodgers || 2–3  || Kimbrel (4–5) || Brazobán (0–1) || Martin (1) || LoanDepot Park || 10,288 || 55–73 || L2
|- style="background:#fbb;" 
| 129 || August 30 || Rays || 2–7 || Chargois (2–0) || Luzardo (3–6) || — || LoanDepot Park || 7,386 || 55–74 || L3
|- style="background:#fbb;"  
| 130 || August 31 || Rays || 1–2  || Adam (2–2) || Nance (0–2) || Beeks (2) || LoanDepot Park || 7,420 || 55–75 || L4
|- 

 
|- style="background:#fbb;"
| 131 || September 2 || @ Braves || 1–8 || Morton (7–5) || Alcántara (12–7) || — || Truist Park || 42,161 || 55–76 || L5
|- style="background:#fbb;" 
| 132 || September 3 || @ Braves || 1–2 || Matzek (4–2) || Okert (5–2) || — || Truist Park || 42,405 || 55–77 || L6
|- style="background:#fbb;"
| 133 || September 4 || @ Braves || 1–7 || Fried (13–5) || López (8–9) || — || Truist Park || 42,360 || 55–78 || L7
|- style="background:#fbb;" 
| 134 || September 6 || @ Phillies || 2–3 || Robertson (4–2) || Nance (0–3) || — || Citizens Bank Park || 17,145 || 55–79 || L8
|- style="background:#fbb;" 
| 135 || September 7 || @ Phillies || 3–4 || Falter (4–3) || Rogers (4–11) || Brogdon (2) || Citizens Bank Park || 17,755 || 55–80 || L9
|- style="background:#bfb;"
| 136 || September 8 || @ Phillies || 6–5 || Floro (1–2) || Robertson (4–3) || — || Citizens Bank Park || 19,073 || 56–80 || W1
|- style="background:#bfb;" 
| 137 || September 9 || Mets || 6–3 || Cabrera (5–2) || Peterson (7–4) || Floro (4) || LoanDepot Park || 12,692 || 57–80 || W2
|- style="background:#fbb;" 
| 138 || September 10 || Mets || 3–11 || Carrasco (14–6) || López (8–10) || — || LoanDepot Park || 17,441 || 57–81 || L1
|- style="background:#fbb;"
| 139 || September 11 || Mets || 3–9 || Walker (11–4) || Luzardo (3–7) || — || LoanDepot Park || 13,234 || 57–82 || L2
|- style="background:#fbb;"
| 140 || September 12  || Rangers || 2–3 || Hernández (2–2) || Okert (5–3) || Leclerc (5) || LoanDepot Park || 5,095 || 57–83 || L3
|- style="background:#bfb;" 
| 141 || September 12  || Rangers || 10–6 || Hoeing (1–1) || Alexy (1–1) || — || LoanDepot Park || 5,242 || 58–83 || W1
|- style="background:#fbb;" 
| 142 || September 13 || Phillies || 1–2 || Falter (5–3) || Alcántara (12–8) || Robertson (20) || LoanDepot Park || 5,801 || 58–84 || L1
|- style="background:#fbb;"
| 143 || September 14 || Phillies || 1–6 || Gibson (10–6) || Cabrera (5–3) || — || LoanDepot Park || 5,632 || 58–85 || L2
|- style="background:#bfb;"
| 144 || September 15 || Phillies || 5–3 || López (9–10) || Syndergaard (9–10) || Floro (5) || LoanDepot Park || 7,877 || 59–85 || W1
|- style="background:#fbb;" 
| 145 || September 16 || @ Nationals || 4–5 || Edwards Jr. (6–3) || Sulser (1–4) || Finnegan (9) || Nationals Park || 24,931 || 59–86 || L1
|- style="background:#fbb;" 
| 146 || September 17 || @ Nationals || 3–5 || Harvey (2–1) || Brigham (0–1) || Finnegan (10) || Nationals Park || 34,179 || 59–87 || L2
|- style="background:#bfb;"
| 147 || September 18 || @ Nationals || 3–1 || Alcántara (13–8) || Sánchez (2–6) || — || Nationals Park || 31,638 || 60–87 || W1
|- style="background:#bfb;" 
| 148 || September 19 || Cubs || 10–3 || Cabrera (6–3) || Miley (1–1) || — || LoanDepot Park || 8,315 || 61–87 || W2
|- style="background:#fbb;" 
| 149 || September 20 || Cubs || 1–2 || Alzolay (1–1) || Okert (5–4) || Hughes (6) || LoanDepot Park || 7,972 || 61–88 || L1
|- style="background:#fbb;" 
| 150 || September 21 || Cubs || 3–4 || Thompson (10–5) || Okert (5–5) || — || LoanDepot Park || 8,753 || 61–89 || L2
|- style="background:#bfb;" 
| 151 || September 23 || Nationals || 5–2 || Garrett (3–6) || Gray (7–10) || Floro (6) || LoanDepot Park || 12,240 || 62–89 || W1
|- style="background:#bfb;" 
| 152 || September 24 || Nationals || 4–1 || Alcántara (14–8) || Fedde (6–11) || Floro (7) || LoanDepot Park || 16,099 || 63–89 || W2
|- style="background:#fbb;"
| 153 || September 25 || Nationals || 1–6 || Sánchez (3–6) || Cabrera (6–4) || — || LoanDepot Park || 13,042 || 63–90 || L1
|- style="background:#bfb;"
| 154 || September 27 || @ Mets || 6–4 || López (10–10) || Carrasco (15–7) || Floro (8) || Citi Field || 29,067 || 64–90 || W1
|- style="background:#fbb;" 
| 155 || September 28 || @ Mets || 4–5  || Smith (3–3) || Floro (1–3) || — || Citi Field || 28,228 || 64–91 || L1
|- style="background:#bfb;" 
| 156 || September 29 || @ Brewers || 4–2 || Nance (1–3) || Peralta (4–4) || Floro (9) || American Family Field || 23,122 || 65–91 || W1
|- style="background:#fbb;" 
| 157 || September 30 || @ Brewers || 0–1 || Burnes (12–8) || Alcántara (14–9) || Williams (15) || American Family Field || 31,945 || 65–92 || L1
|- 

 
|- style="background:#bfb;" 
| 158 || October 1 || @ Brewers || 4–3 || Nance (2–3) || Williams (6–4) || Bleier (1) || American Family Field || 30,686 || 66–92 || W1
|- style="background:#bfb;" 
| 159 || October 2 || @ Brewers || 4–3  || Brazobán (1–1) || Gott (3–3) || Scott (20) || American Family Field || 31,053 || 67–92 || W2
|- style="background:#bfb;"
| 160 || October 3 || Braves || 4–0 || Luzardo (4–7) || Elder (2–4) || — || LoanDepot Park || 10,767 || 68–92 || W3
|- style="background:#fbb;"
| 161 || October 4 || Braves || 1–2 || Odorizzi (6–6) || Garrett (3–7) || Jansen (41) || LoanDepot Park || 14,138 || 68–93 || L1
|- style="background:#bfb;"
| 162 || October 5 || Braves || 12–9 || Nardi (1–1) || Chavez (4–3) || Floro (10) || LoanDepot Park || 12,195 || 69–93 || W1
|-

|-
| Legend:       = Win       = Loss       = PostponementBold = Marlins team member

Statistics

Batting 
(through October 5, 2022)
Players in bold are on the active roster.
Note: G = Games played; AB = At bats; R = Runs; H = Hits; 2B = Doubles; 3B = Triples; HR = Home runs; RBI = Runs batted in; SB = Stolen bases; BB = Walks; K = Strikeouts; Avg. = Batting average; OBP = On base percentage; SLG = Slugging percentage; TB = Total bases

Source

Pitching 
(through October 5, 2022)
Players in bold are on the active roster.
Note: W = Wins; L = Losses; ERA = Earned run average; WHIP = Walks plus hits per inning pitched; G = Games pitched; GS = Games started; SV = Saves; IP = Innings pitched; H = Hits allowed; R = Runs allowed; ER = Earned runs allowed; BB = Walks allowed; K = Strikeouts

Source

Farm system

References

External links 
 2022 Miami Marlins season at Baseball Reference

Miami Marlins season
Miami Marlins
Miami Marlins seasons